Gostomysl is a legendary 9th-century prince or posadnik  of Novgorod who was introduced into the historiography by Vasily Tatishchev, an 18th-century historian. Gostomysl's rule is associated with the confederation of Northern tribes, which was formed to counter the Varangian threat in the mid-9th century and embraced the Ilmen Slavs, Krivichs, Merya, and Chud. Sergey Platonov and Aleksey Shakhmatov believed that the capital of the confederation was in modern Russa and Gostomysl could have been one of its leaders.

According to Tatishchev, who claimed to have derived his information from the now-lost Ioachim Chronicle, Gostomysl was elected by the Ilmen Slavs their supreme ruler and expelled the Varangians from Russia. Once he had a dream of a large tree growing from the womb of his daughter, Umila. This was interpreted by pagan priests as a prophecy of Umila's son becoming a great leader and of his issue coming to rule a large territory. Indeed, after a period of civil disorder, Umila's son Rurik succeeded to his grandfather in Novgorod and his progeny came to rule the largest state in Europe.

The legend of Gostomysl was much aired by the writers and composers working in the nationalist milieu of Catherine II's reign. However, the historians Gerhardt Friedrich Müller and Nikolay Karamzin gave no credit to Tatischev's story, believing that the very name of Gostomysl resulted from a misinterpretation of two Slavic words - gost' ("guest") and mysl' ("thought").

Although Gostomysl's existence is doubted by virtually every modern historian, the name is not an artificial derivation as was previously thought. It was indeed recorded in 844, when Louis the German defeated "rex Gostomuizli" of the Obodrites. Besides, the story of Umila's dream bears striking similarities to the account of Harald Fairhair's birth in some of the Norse sagas, which treat the genealogical tree seen in a dream by his mother on the eve of the childbirth as a symbol of the Hairfair dynasty of which Harald was the author.

References

Russian folklore characters
East Slavic history
Posadniks of Novgorod